For the Summer Olympics, there are 27 venues that have been or will be used for handball.

References

Venues
 
Handball
Olympic venues